The 10.5 cm leFH 18/40 ( "light field howitzer") was a German light howitzer used in  World War II.

History
The 10.5 cm leFH 18/40 supplemented the 10.5 cm leFH 18 and the 10.5 cm leFH 18M as the standard divisional field howitzer used during the Second World War. It was designed in an effort to lighten the weight of the 105 mm artillery piece and to make it easier to produce. Generally it did not equip independent artillery battalions until after the Battle of Stalingrad in 1943. Some were also exported to Finland, where they were known as 105 H 33-40.  The Romanian Army acquired a number of leFH 18/40 in 1943, to make up for the losses in artillery suffered during the Battle of Stalingrad.

Description
In March 1942 a requirement was issued for a lighter howitzer by the Wehrmacht that must also be ready as soon as possible and capable of rapid production. This requirement was met by mounting the barrel of the leFH 18M on the carriage for a 7.5 cm PaK 40 antitank gun. The new carriage used torsion bars running the full length of the carriage to suspend the wheels. The original wheels of the PaK 40 mounting were too small for use by the howitzer and were replaced by larger pressed-steel wheels with solid rubber tires. The new mounting increased the rate of fire as well as making the howitzer somewhat lighter. The leFH 18/40 shared the different muzzle brakes used by the leFH 18M.  After World War II Czechoslovakia continued to use the leFH 18/40 under the designation M18/49.  The M18/49 used pneumatic tires instead of solid rubber tires.

See also
10.5 cm leFH 18
10.5 cm leFH 18M

References

Sources

 Engelmann, Joachim and Scheibert, Horst. Deutsche Artillerie 1934-1945: Eine Dokumentation in Text, Skizzen und Bildern: Ausrüstung, Gliederung, Ausbildung, Führung, Einsatz. Limburg/Lahn, Germany: C. A. Starke, 1974
 Gander, Terry and Chamberlain, Peter. Weapons of the Third Reich: An Encyclopedic Survey of All Small Arms, Artillery and Special Weapons of the German Land Forces 1939-1945. New York: Doubleday, 1979 
 Hogg, Ian V. German Artillery of World War Two. 2nd corrected edition. Mechanicsville, PA: Stackpole Books, 1997 

World War II artillery of Germany
World War II field artillery
105 mm artillery
World War II howitzers
Weapons and ammunition introduced in 1943